Ekaterina Vinogradskaya (1905-1973) was a Russian screenwriter active in the film industry from 1929 through 1952. She studied drama at the First Studio of Moscow Arts Theatre before becoming a writer.

Selected filmography 

 Navstrechu zhizni (1952)
 Put slavy (1949)
 The Great Beginning (1940)
 Anna (1936)
 Begstvuyushchiy ostrov (1929)
 Fragment of an Empire (1929)

References 

1905 births
1973 deaths
Women screenwriters
Mass media people from Moscow
20th-century Russian screenwriters